Moritz Memorial Airport  is a city-owned public-use airport located one mile (2 km) northwest of the central business district of Beloit, a city in Mitchell County, Kansas, United States.

Facilities and aircraft 

For the 12-month period ending May 20, 2008, the airport had 20,000 general aviation aircraft operations, an average of 55 per day. At that time there were 13 aircraft based at this airport:
100% single-engine.

References

External links

Airports in Kansas
Buildings and structures in Mitchell County, Kansas